Carlyle may refer to:

Places
 Carlyle, Illinois, a US city
 Carlyle, Kansas, an unincorporated place in the US
 Carlyle, Montana, a ghost town in the US
 Carlyle, Saskatchewan, a Canadian town
 Carlyle Airport
 Carlyle station
 Carlyle Lake Resort, Saskatchewan, a Canadian hamlet
 Carlyle Hotel, New York City
 Carlyle Restaurant, New York City
 The Carlyle, a residential condominium in Minneapolis, Minnesota
 The Carlyle (Pittsburgh), a residential condominium in Pittsburgh, Pennsylvania

Other uses
 The Carlyle Group, a private equity company based in the US
 Carlyle Works, a former bus bodybuilder in the UK
Carlyle (name)

See also

 Carlisle (disambiguation)
 Carlile (disambiguation)
 Carlyne

English toponymic surnames